Church Mountain, also called Slieve Gad, is the westernmost of the Wicklow Mountains in Ireland. At the summit are the remains of a large ancient cairn of pagan origin. This cairn was partially destroyed and a small building, apparently a church, was built on it in the Middle Ages. Pilgrims formerly climbed the mountain during the festival of Lughnasa to visit a holy well on the summit.

The mountain lies roughly halfway between Hollywood to the north and Donard to the south.

See also
List of mountains in Ireland

References

Mountains and hills of County Wicklow

There is another Church Mountain in Whatcom County, Washington State, USA. It lies in the extreme northwest section of the Mount Baker-Snoqualmie National Forest north of Mount Baker. The national forest link to the trail on this Church Mountain is http://www.fs.usda.gov/wps/portal/fsinternet/!ut/p/c4/04_SB8K8xLLM9MSSzPy8xBz9CP0os3gjAwhwtDDw9_AI8zPwhQoY6BdkOyoCAPkATlA!/?ss=110605&navtype=BROWSEBYSUBJECT&cid=FSE_003853&navid=091000000000000&pnavid=null&position=BROWSEBYSUBJECT&ttype=main&pname=Mt.%20Baker-Snoqualmie%20National%20Forest-%20Home